Gilbert Scott Wright (24 July 18801958) was an English painter. Like his older brother George Wright, he painted hunting and coaching scenes, as well as horse portraits. Wright was one of a family of seven children, five of whom were professional artists, either principally as painters, or as illustrators.

Biography
Wright was born in Leeds on 24 July 1880, and baptised on 29 June 1881. His father was George Edward Wright (24 February 183411 November 1916), an accountant and Elizabeth Scott (c. 184031 May 1916), the daughter or Thomas Scott (born c. 1804), variously a railway engineer and a commission agent. George Edward and Elizabeth were married on 22 August 1859 in St' Jude's Church at Hunslet, Leeds, Yorkshire, England.
 
George Edward Wright and Elizabeth Scott had seven children, five of whom were professional artists, but none of whom has any formal training in art:
George Wright, (30 June 186011 March 1944) the eldest and a noted painter of hunting and coaching scenes.
Louise Wright, born 5 September 1863, a fashion illustrator.
Mabel Wright, born on 26 May 1867. One of only two siblings who were not professional artists. 
Ethel Wright, born 11 October 1870, was the second of the sibling who was not a professional artist. She was living with her sisteres at 131 Woodham lane in September 1939.
Constance Wright (5 March 1877second quarter of 1973), described as a fashion artist in the 1911 census.
Philip Wright, (c. 2 February 187811 July 1926), described as a fashion artist in the 1901 and the 1911 census.
Gilbert Scott Wright, the youngest, and the subject of this article.

Wright married Margaret Ellen Graeme Sharpe (28 February 188012 December 1957) at Christ Church in Forest Hill on 1 June 1912. He married from his parents' home at Kirklees, Honor Oak Park, in Forest Hill. Margaret had been born in Costa Rica to Philip Sharpe (c. 184912 December 1905) and Alianora Rufford (baptised 25 June 18481892).

Wright and Margaret had at least one child, a daughter, Shiela Scott Wright (15 March 191916 December 1993) who was an art student, living with her mother in 1939.

Margaret petitioned for divorce in 1937. Her petition was granted as the 1939 Register showed her marital status as divorced. Margaret died on 12 December 1957. She was living at 22 Grena Road, Richmond, Surrey at the time but dies at 26 Wolverton Avenue, Kingston upon Thames. Her estate was valued at £3,265 18s. 5d. Her daughter was her executrix. Wright served as executor for his brother Philip, and for his parents.

Most sources given 1958 as the year of death for Wright.. However, the only entry for a Gilbert S. Wright of the right age in the UK Death Index suggests that Wright died in the fourth quarter of 1959.

Work
Like the rest of his family, Wright had no formal training in art. He probably learned to paint from his brother George Wright who was twenty years his senior, in producing paintings of sporting and coaching scenes for calendars and other work.  They collaborated until about 1925.

In his early teens Wright fell under the influence of Samuel Edmund Waller, and at the age of 13 began to produce 
paintings of handsome Georgian gallants, many on horseback, either courting or eloping with their lady loves. In 1900 he exhibited How he won the VC7 at the Royal Academy. The painting was soon purchased by a print publisher, and this led to many commissions.
 
Wright produced illustrations for a number of publications including a two-page spread of a Lion in the Path for The Graphic in 1910, a two-page colour hunting illustration for the Illustrated London News in 1913, a colour illustration for The Bystander in 1930. He also produced prints for sale.

Wright produced postcards for James Henderson, for whom Wright painted horses heads, M. Munk, and Tuck,  for whom Wright painted a whole series of sets of cards including:
A Hunting Morning
A Hunting we will go
British Sports
Christmas coaching
Christmas old style with Dickens quotes
Christmas rural insets
Coaching: Series I
Coaching: Series II
Fox Hunting
Hunting

Wright also did some book illustration, normally in full colour. He illustrated the Children's Dickens with eight colour full-page plates. Wright was a regular contributor to the Christmas post cards for the Royal Family. He painted the card for the Prince of Wales in both 1928 and 1931, and for the Duke and Duchess of York in both 1930 and 1935.

Example of book illustration by Wright

In 1909, Wright provide eight full page illustrations for The Children's Dickens: Stories selected from various tale (1909) London: Henry Frowde and Hodder and Stoughton. There was also a colour illustration pasted to the front boards. Abe Books shows two different versions of this illustration, and it may be that Wright produced these as well as the eight full page illustration in the book.

Auction prices
The prices Wright can command are similar to those of his brother George. Record auction prices include:
London, 27 September 1989, Stage for the London to Exeter Coach (oil on canvas. 61x81.5 cm) 19,800 GBP 
New York, Meet at the start of the Hunt (oil on canvas. 40.6x60.9 cm) US$18,400
New York, 12 April 1996, The Day the Stagecoach Passes Through (oil on canvas. 54x91.4 cm) US$23,000
London, 10 November 1999, Passing the Briqhton to London Coach (oil on canvas 61x91 cm) 17,000 GBP

Notes

References

External links
The family home at the time of the 1911 Census on Google Streetview.

1880 births
1958 deaths
People from Leeds
English male painters
English illustrators
19th-century English painters
20th-century English painters
Animal painters
20th-century English male artists
19th-century English male artists